Yigal Palmor is the Head of the International Relations Unit and Foreign Policy Advisor to the Chairman at the Jewish Agency for Israel, where he had previously served for four years as Director of Public Affairs and Communications. He was the longest serving Spokesperson and Head of Press Bureau of the Ministry of Foreign Affairs in Israel from August 2008 to August 2014. Prior to this post, he served stints in Israel's embassies in Madrid (where he was a junior member of the Israeli delegation to the Madrid Conference of 1991) and in Paris, served as Deputy Director of the European Institutions department, and later as Director of the Maghreb, Syria and Lebanon department. He was a spokesperson of the Israeli delegations in a number of peace summits, including the Casablanca and Cairo Regional Economic Summits  and the Annapolis Conference. In February 2013, he was elected "Best Government Spokesperson" in a survey of Israeli journalists.

He made headlines when he called Brazil an "economic and cultural giant but a diplomatic dwarf" in July 2014, in response to Brazil being the only country (with Ecuador) to recall its ambassador for consultations over Israel's military operation in Gaza.
However, his statement encountered a supportive follow-up in some of Brazil's leading media, who used it to criticize their own government's policy, while in Israel, Israeli president Reuven Rivlin's apology came under severe criticism itself.

On 27 May 2014, it was reported that his retirement from the Ministry of Foreign Affairs was imminent, after a career spanning 28 years. Dubbed "a central pole of Israel's communications apparatus", his departure was seen as part of a wave of senior diplomatic resignations due to the weakening of the Foreign Ministry under Avigdor Lieberman. He left the Ministry in September 2014, and joined the Jewish Agency in November of that same year, where he worked closely with Agency's Chairman Natan Sharansky, and later with Chairman Isaac Herzog.

He is the author of the "Diplomatic Cliché Collection" (הקלישאון הדיפלומטי), a compilation of conventional forms of speech in diplomatese and their real, ironic meaning. Or, as Haaretz described it: "A semi-humorous paper intended to translate the euphemisms uttered by leaders, foreign ministers, diplomats and government spokespeople when they are faced with difficult questions".

See also
Foreign Relations of Israel
Ministry of Foreign Affairs (Israel)
List of Israeli ambassadors
Jewish Agency for Israel

References

External links

 Ministry of Foreign Affairs Official website 
 Ministry of Foreign Affairs Official website 
 Ministry of Foreign Affairs Official website 
 Israeli Missions Around the World 
 All Ministers in the Ministry of Foreign Affairs Knesset website 

Foreign relations of Israel
Year of birth missing (living people)
Living people